The 1975–76 Australian region cyclone season was an above average tropical cyclone season.

Systems

Severe Tropical Cyclone Ray

Severe Tropical Cyclone Joan

On the morning of November 30, 1975, satellite imagery showed a large cloud mass in the Timor Sea.  The satellite photograph received on the morning of December 1 showed that significant organization had occurred in the cloud mass during the previous 24 hours. It was deemed at 0115 UTC that the system be named the developing cyclone Joan, located about 310 km west-northwest of Darwin. Joan's movement in the following 48 hours was towards the southwest at an average 5 km/h.   The first evidence of the increasing strength of Joan came as the cyclone moved west-southwest past the northernmost areas of Western Australia on December 3.  The cyclone's generally west-southwesterly track after December 2 took it away from the coast until 0900 6 December when it was about 420 km north of Port Hedland and the system turned southward.  At about 2200 UTC December 7, 1975, the eye of tropical cyclone Joan crossed the coast about 50 km west of Port Hedland. The cyclone was travelling south-southwest at about 14 km/h and crossed over or adjacent to the homesteads on the pastoral properties Mundabullangana, Mallina, Coolawanyah, Hamersley, and Mount Brockman.  As cyclone Joan crossed the coastal plain and the Chichester Range only a slow moderation of its intensity seems to have occurred, but as the cyclone crossed the Hamersley Range the available evidence suggests that a rapid weakening took place.

Tropical cyclone Joan was the most destructive cyclone to affect the Port Hedland area in more than 30 years. The city was subjected to sustained winds exceeding 90 km/h for about 10 hours with winds in excess of 120 km/h for three hours. The maximum measured wind gust of 208 km/h on December 8, 1975, is the fourth highest on record in Australia. Severe property damage occurred at Port Hedland and at other settlements close to the cyclone's path. Subsequent flooding damaged roads and sections of the iron ore railways, particularly that of Hamersley Iron Pty Ltd. Sheep losses were heavy but, remarkably, no loss of human life or serious injury was reported. The estimated damage to private property and public facilities is believed to have exceeded $25 million.

Tropical Cyclone Kim

Tropical Cyclone Sue

Severe Tropical Cyclone David

Severe Tropical Cyclone Vanessa

Tropical Cyclone Alan

Severe Tropical Cyclone Beth

Severe Tropical Cyclone Wally

Tropical Cyclone Hope

Severe Tropical Cyclone Colin

Colin churned up rough seas all across the eastern coast of Australia and caused one fatality as a result when a large wave swept a woman off a cliff.

Tropical Cyclone Alice

Tropical Cyclone Dawn

Tropical Cyclone Linda

Severe Tropical Cyclone Watorea

Tropical Cyclone Carol

See also

Atlantic hurricane seasons: 1975, 1976
Eastern Pacific hurricane seasons: 1975, 1976
Western Pacific typhoon seasons: 1975, 1976
North Indian Ocean cyclone seasons: 1975, 1976

References

Australian region cyclone seasons
Aust
 disasters in Australia
 disasters in Australia
 disasters in Oceania
 disasters in Oceania